The Latin Grammy Award for Best Cumbia/Vallenato Album is an honor presented annually at the Latin Grammy Awards, a ceremony that recognizes excellence and creates a wider awareness of cultural diversity and contributions of Latin recording artists in the United States and internationally.  
The award goes to solo artists, duos, or groups for releasing vocal or instrumental albums containing at least 51% of new recordings.

To date, the award has only been presented to artists originating from Colombia. It was first awarded to Los Hermanos Zuleta for the album Cien Días De Bohemia in 2006. Both Peter Manjarrés and Emiliano Zuleta are the biggest winners in this category with two awards out of three nominations each. The ensemble Binomio de Oro de América holds the record for most nominations without a win with four.

Winners and nominees

2000s

2010s

2020s

 Each year is linked to the article about the Latin Grammy Awards held that year.

See also
Latin Grammy Award for Best Tropical Song

References

General
  Note: User must select the "Tropical Field" category as the genre under the search feature.

Specific

External links
Official site of the Latin Grammy Awards

Cumbia Vallenato Album
Cumbia
Vallenato
Cumbia Vallenato Album